Austrophasma caledonense is a species of insect in the family Mantophasmatidae. It is endemic to western South Africa, where it is known only from near Caledon and from the Kogelberg in Western Cape Province.

References

Mantophasmatidae
Insects of South Africa
Endemic fauna of South Africa